Banda Yeh Bindaas Hai is an unreleased Indian Hindi-language comedy film directed by Ravi Chopra, starring Govinda, Salman Khan, Tabu, Lara Dutta, and Boman Irani. It is a remake of the American film My Cousin Vinny (1992).

Cast 
Govinda as Raj Kumar
 
Salman Khan
Tabu
Lara Dutta
Ashish Chaudhary as Vikram Malhotra
Vishal Malhotra as Jimmy Khanna
Boman Irani as Veer Ahuja
Rajpal Yadav as Ghokla Bhai
Satish Shah as Satish Malhotra
Zakir Hussain as Javed Quadri

Plagiarism charge 

The director was served with a legal notice in 2009 by 20th Century Fox, which charged that the film blatantly plagiarised their 1992 film My Cousin Vinny. Chopra and the production company, Mumbai-based BR Films, denied the charges in court in May 2009; the film's release was to be delayed until June 2009 by order of the Bombay High Court.

A lawsuit was filed against BR Films by Twentieth Century Fox for copying their film without buying the rights. Fox sought damages of $1.4 million; they had given Chopra permission "to make a film loosely based on the Oscar-winning movie" but concluded the final product was a "substantial reproduction" of the original. Fox eventually accepted a $200,000 settlement from the film's producer, although since the death of Ravi Chopra in 2014, it has not seen a theatrical release.

The Telegraph, listing a number of other Bollywood movies "inspired" by Hollywood blockbusters, noted that the case would "decide whether Indian filmmakers can continue to get their 'inspiration' with impunity, or buy rights the legal way."

References 

Films involved in plagiarism controversies
Indian comedy films
Indian remakes of American films
Unreleased Hindi-language films
Foreign films set in the United States